The Stela of Ashurnasirpal II is an enormous Assyrian monolith that was erected during the reign of Ashurnasirpal II.  The stela was discovered in the mid nineteenth century at the ancient site of Kalhu (now known as Nimrud) by the famous British archaeologist Austen Henry Layard. Dated to between 883-859 BC, the sculpture is now part of the British Museum's collection.

Discovery
This stela was found by Layard in 1850 outside the Temple of Ninurta (the Assyrian god of hunting and warfare) at Nimrud. It was shipped to London the following year and gifted to the Museum by the Prince of Wales. For many years the stela was prominently displayed in the museum's Great Court.

Description
The stela, which weighs over 4 tons and is 3 meters high, portrays the Assyrian King worshipping five gods. The monarch is shown wearing a conical hat and full beard, with his right hand extended snapping his fingers, and his left hand holding a mace, symbol of royal authority. The five deities are represented symbolically in the top left hand corner of the stela: Ashur by a horned helmet, Shamash by a winged disk, Sin by a crescent, Adad by a forked line and Ishtar in the form of a star. A large amount of cuneiform text covers the stela, recording the king's military triumphs and conquests.

Gallery

See also
Statue of Ashurnasirpal II
Kurkh Monoliths
Stela of Shamshi-Adad V

References

Further reading
J.E. Reade, Assyrian Sculpture (London, The British Museum Press, 1998)
A.K. Grayson, Assyrian Royal Inscriptions (Wiesbaden, O. Harrassowitz, 1976)
J.E. Curtis and J.E. Reade (eds), Art and empire: treasures from (London, The British Museum Press, 1995)
A.H. Layard, Discoveries in the ruins of Nineveh and Babylon (London, J. Murray, 1853)

Middle Eastern sculptures in the British Museum
Assyrian stelas
Sculpture of the Ancient Near East
Nimrud
Cultural depictions of Ashurbanipal